Mycobacterium is a genus of over 190 species in the phylum Actinomycetota, assigned its own family, Mycobacteriaceae. This genus includes pathogens known to cause serious diseases in mammals, including tuberculosis (M. tuberculosis) and leprosy (M. leprae) in humans. The Greek prefix myco- means 'fungus', alluding to this genus' mold-like colony surfaces. Since this genus has cell walls with Gram-positive and Gram-negative features, acid-fast staining is used to emphasize their resistance to acids, compared to other cell types.

Mycobacterial species are generally aerobic, non-motile, and capable of growing with minimal nutrients. The genus is divided based on each species' pigment production and growth rate. While most Mycobacterium species are non-pathogenic, the genus' characteristic complex cell wall contributes to evasion from host defenses.

Metabolism and morphology

Mycobacteria are aerobic with 0.2-0.6 µm wide and 1.0-10 µm long rod shapes. They are generally non-motile, except for the species Mycobacterium marinum, which has been shown to be motile within macrophages. Mycobacteria possess capsules and most do not form endospores. M. marinum and perhaps M. bovis have been shown to sporulate; however, this has been contested by further research. The distinguishing characteristic of all Mycobacterium species is a thick, hydrophobic, and mycolic acid-rich cell wall made of peptidoglycan and arabinogalactan, with these unique components offering targets for new tuberculosis drugs.

Many Mycobacterium species readily grow with minimal nutrients, using ammonia and/or amino acids as nitrogen sources and glycerol as a carbon source in the presence of mineral salts. Temperatures for optimal growth vary between species and media conditions, ranging from 25-45°C.

Most Mycobacterium species, including most clinically relevant species, can be cultured in blood agar. However, some species grow very slowly due to extremely long reproductive cycles, such as M. leprae requiring 12 days per division cycle compared to 20 minutes for some E. coli strains.

Ecology 
Whereas Mycobacterium tuberculosis and M. leprae are pathogenic, most mycobacteria do not cause disease unless they enter skin lesions of those with pulmonary and/or immune dysfunction, despite being widespread across aquatic and terrestrial environments. Through biofilm formation, cell wall resistance to chlorine, and association with amoebas, mycobacteria can survive a variety of environmental stressors. The agar media used for most water testing does not support the growth of mycobacteria, allowing it to go undetected in municipal and hospital systems.

Pathogenicity 
Mycobacterium tuberculosis can remain latent in human hosts for decades after an initial infection, allowing it to continue infecting others. It has been estimated that a third of the world population has latent tuberculosis (TB). M. tuberculosis has many virulence factors, which can be divided across lipid and fatty acid metabolism, cell envelope proteins, macrophage inhibitors, kinase proteins, proteases, metal-transporter proteins, and gene expression regulators.

Mycobacteria have cell walls with peptidoglycan, arabinogalactan, and mycolic acid; a waxy outer mycomembrane of mycolic acid; and an outermost capsule of glucans and secreted proteins for virulence. It constantly remodels these layers to survive in stressful environments and avoid host immune defenses. This cell wall structure results in colony surfaces resembling fungi, leading to the genus' use of the Greek prefix myco-. This unique structure makes penicillins ineffective, instead requiring a multi-drug antibiotic treatment of isoniazid to inhibit mycolic acid synthesis, rifampicin to interfere with transcription, ethambutol to hinder arabinogalactan synthesis, and pyrazinamide to impede Coenzyme A synthesis.

Genomics
Comparative analyses of mycobacterial genomes have identified several conserved indels and signature proteins that are uniquely found in all sequenced species from the genus Mycobacterium. Additionally, 14 proteins are found only in the species from the genera Mycobacterium and Nocardia, suggesting that these two genera are closely related.

The genomes of some mycobacteria are quite large, such as M. vulneris encoding 6,653 proteins, larger than the ~6000 proteins of eukaryotic yeast.

Species 

Mycobacteria have historically been categorized through phenotypic testing, such as the Runyon classification of analyzing growth rate and production of yellow/orange carotenoid pigments. Group I contains photochromogens (pigment production induced by light), Group II comprises scotochromogens (constitutive pigment production), and the non-chromogens of Groups III and IV have a pale yellow/tan pigment, regardless of light exposure. Group IV species are "rapidly-growing" mycobacteria compared to the "slowly-growing" Group III species because samples grow into visible colonies in less than seven days.

Because the International Code of Nomenclature of Prokaryotes (ICNP) currently recognizes 195 Mycobacterium species, classification and identification systems now rely on DNA sequencing and computational phylogenetics. The major disease-causing groups are the Mycobacterium tuberculosis complex (tuberculosis), Mycobacterium avium complex (mycobacterium avium-intracellulare infection), M. leprae and M. lepromatosis (leprosy), and Mycobacterium abscessus (chronic lung infection).

Microbiologist Enrico Tortoli has constructed a phylogentic tree of the genus' key species based on the earlier genetic sequencing of Rogall, et al. (1990), alongside new phylogentic trees based on Tortoli's 2017 sequencing of 148 Mycobacterium species:

Proposed division of the genus
Gupta et al. have proposed dividing Mycobacterium into five genera, based on an analysis of 150 species in this genus. Due to controversy over complicating clinical diagnoses and treatment, all of the renamed species have retained their original identity in the Mycobacterium genus as a valid taxonomic synonym:
 Mycobacterium based on the Slowly-Growing Tuberculosis-Simiae clade
 Mycobacteroides based on the Rapidly-Growing Abscessus-Chelonae clade
 Mycolicibacillus based on the Slowly-Growing Triviale clade
 Mycolicibacter based on the Slowly-Growing Terrae clade
 Mycolicibacterium based on the Rapidly-Growing Fortuitum-Vaccae clade

Diagnosis
The two most common methods for visualizing these acid-fast bacilli as bright red against a blue background are the Ziehl-Neelsen stain and modified Kinyoun stain. Fite's stain is used to color M. leprae cells as pink against a blue background. Rapid Modified Auramine O Florescent staining has specific binding to slowly-growing mycobacteria for yellow staining against a dark background. Newer methods include Gomori-Methenamine Silver staining and Perioidic Acid Schiff staining to color Mycobacterium avium complex (MAC) cells black and pink, respectively.

While some mycobacteria can take up to eight weeks to grow visible colonies from a cultured sample, most clinically relevant species will grow within the first four weeks, allowing physicians to consider alternative causes if negative readings continue past the first month.

Mycobacteriophages 
Mycobacteria can be infected by mycobacteriophages, a class of viruses with high specificity for their targets. By hijacking the cellular machinery of mycobacteria to produce additional phages, such viruses can be used in phage therapy for eukaryotic hosts, as they would die alongside the mycobacteria. Since only some mycobacteriophages are capable of penetrating the M. tuberculosis membrane, the viral DNA may be delivered through artificial liposomes because bacteria uptake, transcribe, and translate foreign DNA into proteins.

Mycosides 
Mycosides are glycolipids isolated from Mycobacterium species with Mycoside A found in photochromogenic strains, Mycoside B in bovine strains, and Mycoside C in avian strains. Different forms of Mycoside C have varying success as a receptor to inactivate mycobacteriophages. Replacement of the gene encoding mycocerosic acid synthase in M. bovis prevents formation of mycosides.

References

External links 
 Bacterial and Viral Bioinformatics Resource Center: Genomes, proteins, epitopes, and pathways of mycobacteria
 Merck Manual - Mycobacteria
 Mycobrowser: Genomic and proteomic database for pathogenic mycobacteria
 CDC - Nontuberculous Mycobacteria (NTM) Infections
 PRASITE: Identification of Mycobacteria
 TB Structural Genomics Consortium

Acid-fast bacilli
Tuberculosis
Bacteriology
Bacterial diseases
Bacteria genera
Mycobacteria
Pathogenic bacteria
Infectious causes of cancer